Ekelund is a surname of Scandinavian origin. The name may refer to:

Allan Ekelund (1918–2009), Swedish film producer
Bo Ekelund (1894–1983), Swedish Olympic athlete in the high jump
Henrik Ekelund, Swedish business consultant and executive
Hilding Ekelund (1893–1984), Finnish architect
Irene Ekelund (born 1997), Swedish athlete
Kalle Ekelund (born 1990), Swedish ice hockey player
Karin Ekelund (1913–1976), Swedish actress
Ole Magnus Ekelund (born 1980), Norwegian handball player
Robert Ekelund (born 1940), American economist
Ronnie Ekelund (born 1972), Danish football player
Vilhelm Ekelund (1880–1949), Swedish poet